Annexin A9 is a protein that in humans is encoded by the ANXA9 gene.

Function 

The annexins are a family of calcium-dependent phospholipid-binding proteins. Members of the annexin family contain 4 internal repeat domains, each of which includes a type II calcium-binding site. The calcium-binding sites are required for annexins to aggregate and cooperatively bind anionic phospholipids and extracellular matrix proteins. This gene encodes a divergent member of the annexin protein family in which all four homologous type II calcium-binding sites in the conserved tetrad core contain amino acid substitutions that ablate their function. However, structural analysis suggests that the conserved putative ion channel formed by the tetrad core is intact.

Model organisms
Model organisms have been used in the study of ANXA9 function. A conditional knockout mouse line called Anxa9tm1b(EUCOMM)Wtsi was generated at the Wellcome Trust Sanger Institute. Male and female animals underwent a standardized phenotypic screen to determine the effects of deletion. Additional screens performed:  - In-depth immunological phenotyping - in-depth bone and cartilage phenotyping

References

External links

Further reading